Sanjay Kumar Rai (born 1 May 1979) is an Indian track and field athlete from Uttar Pradesh, India who specializes in the long jump event. He competed at the 2000 Sydney Olympic Games but did not record a valid jump.  His personal best jump in IAAF competition is 8.03 m at the 2000 Asian Athletics Championships in Jakarta in 2000, where he won the silver medal.

He has succeeded T. C. Yohannan of Kerala. Later Amritpal Singh (8.08 m) broke his record in the 10th Federation Cup Athletics Championships at the Nehru Stadium in New Delhi in 2004.

Later in his career he did not get proper support from IAF when he was injured.

References

External links
 
 

1979 births
Olympic athletes of India
Athletes (track and field) at the 2000 Summer Olympics
Indian male long jumpers
Living people
Athletes from Uttar Pradesh